Asmirandah Zantman (born October 5, 1989), also known as Asmirandah, is an Indonesian actress and singer. She began her career in the world of entertainment through the soap opera, Kawin Gantung.

Biography
Asmirandah was born October 5, 1989, in Jakarta, she is the last child of H. Anton Farmidji Zantman and Hj. Sani Suliwati. She is mixed due to the fact that her father is Dutch and her mother Betawi.

She started appearing in Indonesians soaps operas in early 2004. She progressed to older model roles in several commercials such as Coca-Cola and Suzuki, with her advantageous physical appearance and her long hair.

In 2012 Asmirandah published her first collection of short stories, Lovandah.

Personal life
Asmirandah has had a relationship with actor Dude Harlino in the late 2000s, but they eventually separated because of the age difference in 2011. In 2012, she confirmed her relationship with actor Jonas Rivanno despite their religious differences, which establishes a controversy in the Indonesian culture and has not been approved by Asmirandah's family.

Educated in a devout Muslim family, she converted to Protestantism and was baptized in July 2013, then married Jonas Rivanno in Singapore, on 22 December 2013. She denied the rumors of forced conversion, saying it was voluntary after dreaming of Jesus.

Today she uses the alias name Maria Wattimena, given by Rivanno.

Filmography

Feature films 
 Liar (Wild Ones; 2008)
 Ketika Cinta Bertasbih 2 (When love glorify 2; 2009)
 Dalam Mihrab Cinta (In the sanctuary of love; 2010)
 Jakarta Hati (Jakarta Heart; 2012)
 Rectoverso (Rectoverso; 2013)
 Isyarat (Signal; 2013)

Soap operas 

 Kawin Gantung 2
 Inikah Rasanya? 
 Cinta SMU 2
 Arti Cinta
 Maha Kasih 2
 Kau Masih Kekasihku 
 Wulan 
 Baby Doll
 Melody

 Aisyah 
 Nona Dewa
 Hingga Akhir Waktu 
 Kau Masih Kekasihku
 Sekar 
 Nikita 
 Kemilau Cinta Kamila 
 Dari Sujud Ke Sujud
 Binar Bening Berlian 
 ISkul Musikal 
 Separuh Aku 
 Mutiara Dari Surga

Discography
 Ketulusan Cinta (2009)
 Salahkah Kita (2009)
 Bunga-Bunga Cinta (2010)
 Lagu Tema Agu Inkin Kamu (2011)
 Aku Jatu Hati (2012)
 Kesetiaanmu Selamatkanku (2015)

Advertisements

 AC Sharps
 XL 
 Fatigon C Plus
 Coca-Cola 
 Gery Cokluut & Gery Saluut
 Rexona
 Pucelle
 Suzuki Spin
 Vitacimin
 Axe

 IM3 Indosat
 SkinWhite
 Mito
 Bontea Green
 AC Sharp Sayonara V
 Head & Shoulders
 Kendra
 Homyped
 Biore
 Fatigon C+

Video Clips

Awards and nominations

References

External links
  
 

Living people
1989 births
21st-century Indonesian actresses
21st-century Indonesian women singers
Actresses from Jakarta
Betawi people
Sundanese people
Javanese people
Converts to Protestantism from Islam
Indo people
Indonesian Christians
Indonesian Protestants
Indonesian female models
Indonesian film actresses
Indonesian former Muslims
Indonesian people of Dutch descent
Indonesian people of French descent
Indonesian people of English descent
Indonesian songwriters
Indonesian women writers
Singers from Jakarta